Eucithara rufolineata is a small sea snail, a marine gastropod mollusk in the family Mangeliidae.

Description

Distribution
This marine species occurs off Japan

References

 Higo, Shun’ichi, and Y. Goto. "A systematic list of molluscan shells from the Japanese Is. and the adjacent area." Osaka: Yuko (1993).

External links
 
  Tucker, J.K. 2004 Catalog of recent and fossil turrids (Mollusca: Gastropoda). Zootaxa 682:1-1295

rufolineata
Gastropods described in 1993